Salih Bora (born 23 August 1953) is a Turkish former wrestler who competed in the 1976 Summer Olympics and in the 1984 Summer Olympics.

References

External links
 

1953 births
Living people
Olympic wrestlers of Turkey
Wrestlers at the 1976 Summer Olympics
Wrestlers at the 1984 Summer Olympics
Turkish male sport wrestlers
Mediterranean Games gold medalists for Turkey
Mediterranean Games bronze medalists for Turkey
Mediterranean Games medalists in wrestling
Competitors at the 1979 Mediterranean Games
Competitors at the 1983 Mediterranean Games
20th-century Turkish people
21st-century Turkish people
World Wrestling Championships medalists